Nipesotsu-Maruyama is a volcanic group situated in Hokkaidō, Japan.

It is composed of several stratovolcanoes and lava domes, including:

 Mount Nipesotsu
 Mount Maru (Kamishihoro-Shintoku)
 Mount Tengu
 Mount Kotengu
 Mount Gunkan
 1332 Meter Peak
 Mount Upepesanke

See also
List of volcanoes in Japan

References

External links
 Nipesotsu-Maruyama Volcano Group - Geological Survey of Japan

Volcanoes of Hokkaido
Volcanism of Japan
Volcanic groups